Ligovsky pond is artificial lake existing in Ligovo, suburb of Saint Petersburg (Russia) in 1716–1941.

In 1703, Peter I had been based the city of Saint Petersburg and this area became capital suburb.
In 1710s emperor has taken part in destiny of settlement - it has enjoined to block the Dudergofka river in 1715.
On a dam the watermill which specialised on flour-grinding and felting works has been constructed.

Simultaneously with barrage of Dudergofka river has been dug the Ligovsky channel. It has taken away an essential part of water from Dudergofka and the artificial lake became a source of water for Ligovo. At that time surrounding district represented imperial grange for maintenance of a palace with the foodstuffs; there was a dairy farm, kitchen gardens.

When in 1765 owner of district became Grigory Orlov, for it on the bank of lake buildings have been built.
On the western coast of a pond were the house with landing stage and economic constructions.
On east coast the manour house where Orlov accepted Russian empress Catherine II has been constructed.

After 1783, when Grigory Orlov is dead, earths of Ligovo have been inherited by its pupil Natalia Alekseeva, she was married for aide-de-camp of Orlov Friedrich Wilhelm von Buxhoeveden.
In 1840s the manor of Buxhoeveden has passed to count G. G. Kushelev-Bezbordko (younger), it has continued useful agricultural activity of count Orlov, and Ligovo became an exemplary agricultural manor.
Have spent a network of avenues and paths, have created specific hills, have dug out ponds.
The house has a connected covered transition to kitchen, to the north from it have organised separate zones — an orchard with greenhouses, stables, the bird's and cattle courtyard.
Lake coast too have improved - by the architect A. Stackenschneider have been constructed terrace, going down from the house to lake, a grotto on love island.

After Kushelev-Bezbordko's death the manor gradually fell into decay.
In 1857 in Ligovo has come Baltic railway, by the end 1870s vicinities Ligovsky pond became country area; on lake summer residents went for a drive on boats.
To October Revolution in 1917 the lake, a dam and a mill were supported as it should be.
After that the mill has stopped, contemporaries recollected that water falls fell from a dam.

The pond mirror was supported by a dam of a mill till 1941. On 5 December 1941 German armies destroyed the dam on the approach to Leningrad. After the Second World War hydraulic work was not restored. On a lake place the big ravine which has grown with a bush settles down. The territory of the former lake is not built up - it is a memorial zone: in fights on this place was lost more than 700 persons. Near to the former lake the memorial Orthodox church is under construction.

References

Watermills in Russia
Former lakes of Europe
Reservoirs in Saint Petersburg
Reservoirs in Russia